The 1893 Virginia Orange and Blue football team represented the University of Virginia as an independent during the 1893 college football season. Led by first-year coach Johnny Poe, the team went 8–3 and claims a Southern championship.

Schedule

References

Virginia
Virginia Cavaliers football seasons
Virginia Orange and Blue football